Yu Ji-in (born January 27, 1956) is a South Korean actress active since 1974. She was born Lee Yun-hui in Seoul, South Korea in 1956 and received a bachelor's and master's degree in Theater and Film from Chung-Ang University. When she was a freshman at the school in 1974, she started her acting career after getting elected in a joint recruit held by the Yeonbang Film, and Weekly Hankook. From onwards to 1977, she appeared in one to three films per year and at the same time, she also acted as a TV actress affiliated to TBC TV. Yu was commonly referred to as "New Troika" or "Second Troika" along with her rival actresses, Jeong Yun-hui and Chang Mi-hee of the 1970s and 1980s after the "First Troika", Moon Hee, Nam Jeong-im, and Yoon Jeong-hee of the 1960s.

Filmography
*Note; the whole list is referenced.
 Green Knights (2007)
 Miri, Mari, Wuri, Duri (1988)   
 The Winter That Year Was Warm (1984)   
 Wife (1983)   
 The Tree Blooming with Love (1981)   
 The Maiden Who Went to the City (1981)   
 Even If You Take Everything (1981)   
 Home of the Stars 3 (1981)   
 Whale Island Escapade (1981)   
 Good Windy Day (1980)   
 Unconditional Love (1980)   
 Woman's Room (1980)   
 You Whom I Cannot Hate (1980)   
 Echoes (1980)   
 The Man Who Dies Every Day (1980)   
 She is Something (1980)   
 Dull Servant Pal Bul-chul (1980)   
 The Hut (1980)   
 The Man of the Past (1980)   
 The Last Secret Affair (1980)   
 One Night at a Strange Place (1980)   
 Woman on Vacation (1980)   
 Magnificent Experience (1980)   
 Happiness of an Unhappy Woman (1979)
 The Trappings of Youth (1979)   
 The Man I Left (1979)   
 26 x 365 = 0 (26 x 365 = 0 26 x 365 = 0, 1979)   
 The Rose That Swallowed Thorn (1979)   
 Wild Ginseng (1979)   
 The Terms of Love (1979)   
 Sudden Flame (1979)   
 Zero Woman (1979)   
 A Record of Love and Death (1978)   
 Confession of Life or Death (1978)   
 The Police Officer (1978)   
 Rely on Your Brother (1978)   
 The Last Winter (1978)   
 The Last Leaf (1977)   
 Full Of Happy Dream (1976)   
 Return to Fatherland, Korea (1976)   
 You are the Sun and I'm the Moon (1976)   
 The Tae-Baeks (1975)   
 A Remodeled Beauty (1975)   
 Nasang (1974)   
 A Story of Crazy Painter: Gwanghwasa (1974)   
 Hwannyeo (1974)   
 Your Cold Hands (1974)

Awards
1979, the 18th Grand Bell Awards, Best Actress for Simbwatda (심봤다)
1980, the 16th Baeksang Arts Awards, Best Film Actress for Simbwatda (심봤다)

References

External links

1956 births
People from Seoul
Living people
Chung-Ang University alumni
South Korean television actresses
South Korean film actresses
Best Actress Paeksang Arts Award (film) winners